The 2014–15 UMass Minutemen ice hockey team represented the University of Massachusetts Amherst during the 2014–15 NCAA Division I men's ice hockey season. The team was coached by John Micheletto, in his 3rd season with the Minutemen. The Minutemen played their home games at the Mullins Center on campus in Amherst, Massachusetts, competing in Hockey East.

Previous season
In 2013–14, the Minutemen finished 10th in Hockey East with a record of 8–22–4, 4–13–3 in conference play. In the 2014 Hockey East Men's Ice Hockey Tournament, they lost in the opening round to Vermont, by a score of 2–1. They failed to qualify for the 2014 NCAA Division I Men's Ice Hockey Tournament.

Personnel

Roster
As of December 22, 2014.

Coaching staff

Standings

Schedule

|-
!colspan=12 style=""| Exhibition

|-
!colspan=12 style=""| Regular Season

|-
!colspan=12 style=""| Postseason

Rankings

References

UMass Minutemen ice hockey seasons
UMass Minutemen
UMass Minutemen